Ensemble Theatre Cincinnati is a professional equity theatre located at 1127 Vine Street in Cincinnati, Ohio that was founded in 1986. It is Greater Cincinnati’s second largest professional theatre, and until April 2012 was known as "Ensemble Theatre of Cincinnati. The company is "dedicated to producing world and regional premieres of works that often explore compelling social issues."

References

External links
 Official website 

Theatre companies in Cincinnati
Theatres in Cincinnati
Regional theatre in the United States
1986 establishments in Ohio
Over-the-Rhine